Arpa Tappehsi (also romanized as Ārpā Tappehsī and Ārpātappahsī; also known as Ārpā Tappeh, Arpatepe, and Meseh Chāy) is a village in Vilkij-e Shomali Rural District, in the Central District of Namin County, Ardabil Province, Iran. At the 2006 census, its population was 130, in 34 families.

References 

Towns and villages in Namin County